Cambodian National Insurance Company (CAMINCO) is a Cambodian private insurance company with 25% of its shares owned by the Royal Government of Cambodia. It is a subsidiary of Varyia BVB Insurance.

History
CAMINCO was officially incorporated in 1990, becoming the first insurance company in Cambodia. It began its operations during June 1993.

In 2000, the Insurance Law was passed and in 2001, the Sub-decree Nº132 on Insurance came into force. As a result, CAMINCO restructured into a state owned enterprise. CAMINCO was able to meet the capital requirement of USD 7 Millions, the insurance company to do so, and the only company to receive the 5-year license on General Insurance Services from the Ministry of Economy and Finance.

On Monday 6 April 2009, the Royal Government of Cambodia sold 75% of its shares in the formerly state owned CAMINCO insurance company for US$5.7 million. The Royal Government however, retains a 25% share in the company. The existence of the deal was not widely known. Cheam Yeap, the head of the National Assembly's banking and finance committee and a Cambodian People's Party MP, told the Phnom Penh Post that he knew 
nothing about it.

Business partners 
Swiss Reinsurance Company
Mitsui Sumitomo Insurance Company
Tokio Marine & Fire Insurance
Toa Reinsurance Company
Korean Reinsurance Company
S.A. Jean Verheyen
Malaysian Reinsurance Berhad
BEST RE
General Insurance Corporation of India (GICI)
Asian Reinsurance Corporation
Ho Chi Minh City Insurance Company (Bao Minh)
Professional Insurance Brokers

See also
 BVB

References

External links
 Cambodian National Insurance Company

Insurance companies of Cambodia
Companies of Cambodia
Financial services companies established in 1990
Cambodian brands
Companies based in Phnom Penh
Cambodian companies established in 1990